The 1963 Nobel Prize in Literature was awarded the Greek poet and diplomat Giorgos Seferis (1900–1971) "for his eminent lyrical writing, inspired by a deep feeling for the Hellenic world of culture." He is the first Greek laureate to win the Nobel Prize  (followed later by Odysseas Elytis in 1979).

Laureate

Giorgos Seferis was born in Smyrna (present day Izmir, Turkey). When his family moved to France in 1918, he studied law at the University of Paris and became interested in literature. He then went to Athens in 1925 and began a long diplomatic career. During World War II, Seferis accompanied the Free Greek Government in exile and returned to liberated Athens in 1944. Many of his, which are replete with themes of alienation, traveling, and death, are set against the backdrop of his extensive travels as a diplomat. Turning Point, his debut book of poems, was released in 1931. In his later poetry, Seferis frequently weaves together modern speech and experience with Homeric myth, notably in works like Mythistorema (1935) and Imerologio Katastromatos I-III (1940-1955).

Deliberations

Nominations
Seferis was first nominated in 1955 by Romilly Jenkins (1907–1969), an English professor in Byzantine and Modern Greek literature, and was followed by nominations from T. S. Eliot, C. A. Trypanis and Eyvind Johnson until he was eventually awarded. He only received 5 nominations.

In total, the Nobel Committee of the Swedish Academy received 121 nominations for 81 distinguished authors such as Jorge Luis Borges, Jean-Paul Sartre (awarded in 1964), Martin Buber, E. M. Forster, Graham Greene, Salvador de Madariaga, André Malraux, and Ramón Menéndez Pidal. The highest number of nominations (with 8 nominations) was for the American poet Robert Frost. 22 of the nominees were nominated for the first time like Marcel Jouhandeau, Vladimir Nabokov, Michel Butor, Yukio Mishima, Jean Cocteau, André Breton, Nelly Sachs (awarded in 1966), René Étiemble, and Yevgeny Yevtushenko. Five of the nominees were women, namely Ingeborg Bachmann, Juana de Ibarbourou, Gertrud von le Fort, Kate Roberts, and Nelly Sachs. Surprisingly, two heads of state and government were nominated: French president Charles de Gaulle and Senegalese president Léopold Sédar Senghor.

The authors Ion Agârbiceanu, Herbert Asbury, Luis Cernuda, W. E. B. Du Bois, Pola Gojawiczyńska, Edith Hamilton, Christopher Hassall, Nâzım Hikmet, Ernst Kantorowicz, C. S. Lewis, Marie Linde, Brinsley MacNamara, Louis MacNeice, Margaret Murray, Clifford Odets, Yōko Ōta, Sylvia Plath, Theodore Roethke, Kay Sage, Tristan Tzara, Hilda Vīka, William Carlos Williams, and Stark Young died in 1963 without having been nominated for the prize. The American poet Robert Frost died months before the announcement.

Prize decision
The Nobel committee of the Swedish Academy was unanimous to propose that the prize should be awarded to Giorgos Seferis. Seferis was one of the final three candidates for the prize along with W.H. Auden and Pablo Neruda (awarded in 1971). The permanent secretary of the Swedish Academy and chairman of the Nobel committee Anders Österling felt "that there now was an opportunity to pay a beautiful tribute to modern Hellas, a language area that so far had been waiting too long [to be] honored in this context". The candidacies of Samuel Beckett (awarded in 1969) and Vladimir Nabokov were dismissed by Österling arguing that neither author lived up to the Nobel prize's "ideal intentions". Österling was also hesitant to award Pablo Neruda and the long time candidate Mikhail Sholokhov for political reasons, but both of them were subsequently awarded the prize. Nelly Sachs was nominated for the first time by committee member Karl Ragnar Gierow. While the committee felt that it was too early for her candidacy, Gierow proposed that the poet should be taken into consideration and Sachs was eventually awarded the prize in 1966.

Notes

References

External links

1963